The 2020–21 Iowa Hawkeyes women's basketball team represented the University of Iowa during the 2020–21 NCAA Division I women's basketball season. The Hawkeyes were led by twenty-first year head coach Lisa Bluder and played their home games at Carver–Hawkeye Arena in Iowa City, IA as members of the Big Ten Conference.

The Hawkeyes finished the season 20–10, 11–8 in Big Ten play to finish in sixth place.  They received a bye into the Second Round of the Big Ten women's tournament where they defeated Purdue, Rutgers, and Michigan before losing in the final to Maryland.  They received an at-large bid to the NCAA tournament.  As the five seed in the Riverwalk Regional, they defeated twelve seed  and four seed Kentucky before losing to one seed UConn to end their season.

Previous season 

The Hawkeyes finished the season 26–4, 14–4 in Big Ten play to finish in third place.  In the Big Ten tournament they lost to Ohio State in the first round.  They did not get a chance for further post season play, as the NCAA women's basketball tournament and WNIT were cancelled before they began due to the COVID-19 pandemic.

Roster

Schedule and results

Source:

|-
!colspan=6 style=| Regular season

|-
!colspan=6 style=| Big Ten Women's Tournament

|-
!colspan=6 style=| NCAA tournament

Rankings

The Coaches Poll did not release a Week 2 poll and the AP Poll did not release a poll after the NCAA Tournament.

See also
2020–21 Iowa Hawkeyes men's basketball team

References

Iowa Hawkeyes women's basketball seasons
Iowa
Iowa Hawkeyes
Iowa Hawkeyes
Iowa